Michel Barbey (1927-) is a French stage, film, and television actor known for his comic roles. He starred in the 1950 film Dominique.

Selected filmography
 Lawless Roads (1947)
 Rendezvous in July (1949)
 The Wolf (1949)
 Cartouche, King of Paris (1950)
 Dominique (1950)
 The Girl with the Whip (1952)
 The Secret of the Mountain Lake (1952)
 Their Last Night (1953)
 The Case of Doctor Laurent (1957)
 La Horse (1970)

References

Bibliography
 Goble, Alan. The Complete Index to Literary Sources in Film. Walter de Gruyter, 1999.

External links

1927 births
Living people
French male film actors
French male stage actors
French male television actors